Clarks Creek is a stream in Geary and Morris counties, Kansas in the United States.

Clarks Creek was named in honor of members of the Lewis and Clark Expedition who camped near its banks.

See also
List of rivers of Kansas

References

Rivers of Geary County, Kansas
Rivers of Morris County, Kansas
Rivers of Kansas